Ambuja Cements Limited, formerly known as Gujarat Ambuja Cement Limited, is a major Indian cement producing company. The Group markets cement and clinker for both domestic and export markets.

Partnership
The company had entered into a strategic partnership with Holcim, the second-largest cement manufacturer in the world from 2006. Holcim had, in January, bought a 14.8 percent promoters' stake in the GACL for INR 21.4 billion.

From 2010 to 2022, Holcim held a 61.62% controlling stake in Ambuja Cements. On 14 April 2022, Holcim announced that it would exit from the Indian market after 17 years of operations as part of a strategy to focus on core markets, and listed its stakes in Ambuja Cements and ACC for sale. On May 15, 2022, Adani Group acquired Holcim's stake in Ambuja Cements and ACC for US$10.5 billion.

See also

 Tarachand Ghanshyamdas

References

External links

 Cement companies of India
1986 establishments in Maharashtra
Manufacturing companies based in Mumbai
Manufacturing companies established in 1986
Indian brands
Indian companies established in 1986
Holcim Group
Companies listed on the National Stock Exchange of India
Companies listed on the Bombay Stock Exchange